French Lake is a lake in Wright County, in the U.S. state of Minnesota.

A large share of the early settlers near the lake being French Canadians caused the name to be selected.

See also
List of lakes in Minnesota

References

Lakes of Minnesota
Lakes of Wright County, Minnesota